New Jersey has seven metropolitan statistical areas (MSAs) defined by the federal Office of Management and Budget.  The New York City and Philadelphia MSAs are also divided into divisions, of which there are five in New Jersey. Every statistical area and county in New Jersey belong to the Northeast Megalopolis.

New York-Newark-Jersey City, NY-NJ-PA Metropolitan Statistical Area (19,979,477)
New York-Jersey City-White Plains NY-NJ Metropolitan Division (2,116,063)
 Bergen County (936,692)
 Hudson County (676,061)
 Passaic County (503,310)
 Edison NJ Metropolitan Division (2,383,854)
 Middlesex County (829,685)
 Monmouth County (621,354)
 Ocean County (601,651)
 Somerset County (331,164)
 Newark-Union, NJ-PA Metropolitan Division (2,117,575)
 Essex County (799,767)
 Hunterdon County (124,714)
 Morris County (494,228)
 Sussex County (140,799)
 Union County (558,067)
 Trenton-Princeton, NJ Metropolitan Statistical Area (369,811)
 Mercer County (369,811)
 Allentown-Bethlehem-Easton, PA-NJ Metropolitan Statistical Area (842,913)
 Warren County (105,779)
 Philadelphia-Camden-Wilmington, PA-NJ-DE-MD Metropolitan Statistical Area (6,096,372)
 Camden, NJ Metropolitan Division (1,243,870)
 Burlington County (445,384)
 Camden County (507,078)
 Gloucester County (291,408)
 Wilmington, DE-MD-NJ Metropolitan Division (724,768)
 Salem County (62,607)
 Atlantic City-Hammonton, NJ Metropolitan Statistical Area (265,429)
 Atlantic County (265,429)
 Vineland-Bridgeton, NJ Metropolitan Statistical Area (150,972)
 Cumberland County (150,972)
 Ocean City, NJ Metropolitan Statistical Area (92,560)
 Cape May County (92,560)

See also 

 New Jersey statistical areas
 New York Metropolitan Area
 Philadelphia Metropolitan Area
 Metropolitan Statistical Area
 Combined Statistical Area
 New Jersey

Sources
 U.S. Census Bureau Metropolitan Statistical Areas and Components, December 2005, with codes

Metropolitan areas of New Jersey